Graham Robertson may refer to:
 Graham Robertson (filmmaker)
 Graham Robertson (bowls)
 W. Graham Robertson, British painter, illustrator and author

See also
 Graeme Robertson (disambiguation)